The William Flynn Tournament Most Valuable Player is an annual award given out at the conclusion of the Hockey East tournament to the best player in the championship as voted by a panel of writers and broadcasters. The award is named in honor of former Boston College athletic director William Flynn.

The Tournament MVP was first awarded in 1985 and every year thereafter.

Connor Hellebuyck and Bobby Trivigno are the only players to have won the award more than once, both doing so in consecutive years. Four recipients have received the honor while not playing for the conference champion, all of them being the runner-up goaltender. (as of 2022)

The 2020 tournament was cancelled due to the COVID-19 pandemic in the United States, as a result a Tournament MVP was not awarded that year.

Award winners

Note: * recipient not on championship team

Winners by school

Winners by position

See also
Hockey East Awards

References

General

Specific

External links
Hockey East Awards (Incomplete)

College ice hockey trophies and awards in the United States
Boston College Eagles men's ice hockey